Fei Lung (also known as Feiloong) was an early gunboat of the Qing Dynasty.

Fei Lung, along with her sister ships An Lan and Chen T'ao (see below), were British gunboats purchased through the British Consulate in Canton by Viceroy of Liangguang  in 1867. The increase in mercantile activity in Canton had attracted pirates, and the Canton government hoped to use these vessels to curb piracy. Their hulls were composite-built, with wooden planking over an iron frame, and each was generally equipped with seven guns. They arrived at Canton between 1867 and 1868, becoming part of the Guangdong Fleet and participated in anti-piracy patrol duties near the city. 

Fei Lung was purchased for the price of 23,300 silver taels and was delivered to Canton between January and February 1867.  Her first Chinese commander was He Guangyao (何光堯). She was lost on 22 September 1874 during the 1874 Hong Kong typhoon off Kap Shui Mun with the loss of all 43 crew.

An Lan (also known as An Nan or Aulan) and Chen T'ao were purchased for the price of 46,067 silver taels each. They were assembled in Hong Kong and were delivered to Canton between August and September 1868. The first Chinese commander for An Lan was Huang Tingyao (黃庭耀), while Fan Ganting (范幹挺) was the first Chinese commander of Chen T'ao. Their fates were not known.

Notes

Citations

References

 
 
 
 
 

Naval ships of Imperial China
Gunboats of China
Maritime incidents in September 1874